Pleuroflammula is a genus of fungi in the Crepidotaceae family. The genus contains ten species found in America and Asia.

References

External links

Crepidotaceae
Taxa named by Rolf Singer